Abantis adelica, the western ragged skipper, is a butterfly in the family Hesperiidae. It is found in Senegal, Burkina Faso, Guinea, Ghana, Togo, northern Nigeria, north-western Kenya, the Democratic Republic of the Congo (Shaba), Malawi and possibly southern Sudan, Ethiopia and Uganda. The habitat consists of Guinea savanna.

Adults feed from the flowers of Tridax species.

The larvae possibly feed on Grewia species

References

Butterflies described in 1892
Tagiadini
Butterflies of Africa